The Wolleson–Nicewander Building, also known as the Triton Insurance Company Building, was built in 1900, and is within the Perry Courthouse Square Historic District in Perry, Oklahoma.  Its builder, T. E. Wollenson, was a sailor and merchant who had immigrated from Denmark, and settled in Perry. Wollenson bought a lot on the north side of what is now called Courthouse Square. He then built a two-story building, that soon housed the Nicewander Clothing store. Later occupants included a dry goods store, a tire and auto supply store, and an insurance company headquarters.

History
The building was first occupied by T. E. Wollenson. According to Waymarking.com's description of this building, Wollenson opened his Boston Dry Goods Store on the lower floor, and operated it there until 1910. Mr. Nicewander later had a clothing store there, followed by N. C. Chapman who had a dry goods store, and then by P. Scobill who had a tire and auto supply store.  In the 1960s the building became the headquarters of the Triton Insurance Group.  The company redecorated the outside and inside of the building, including adding a huge map of the state of Oklahoma, still visible on its east side (photo below) The Triton Insurance Group left Perry in 1974.

Description
The address is 615 Delaware in Perry.
and included several naval motifs on the building (photos below).  It is two stories, constructed of red brick and sandstone, in a Richardsonian Romanesque style. Four elongated vertical windows provide ventilation to the second floor rooms. Black-painted wrought iron railings provide some protection to the windows. A large double door with a horseshoe "rosette" on its top provide access to the building,

Originally, the facade of the first floor resembled that of the second floor, except that it was covered with a more modernistic light concrete veneer over the original red brick and sandstone. The second story retains the Romanesque arches and decorated lintels, which are supported by colonnettes. Each colonnette has a lion's head, reminiscent of the carved figureheads which adorned the prows of old seagoing vessels.

At the time of the NRHP inventory, the ground floor was divided into two large rooms, which were occupied by the Elwell Auto Supply store. The upper floor is divided into several rooms, which the Triton Life Insurance Company used as offices. They have been vacant since Triton moved out in 1974.

A large map of Oklahoma decorates the building's outer wall. The map shows the various stages of the history of Oklahoma and it was painted, together with other paintings that decorate the interior, by Adriano Ceciloni and Charles Wysocki.

Notes

References

Commercial buildings on the National Register of Historic Places in Oklahoma
Buildings and structures completed in 1900
Buildings and structures in Noble County, Oklahoma
National Register of Historic Places in Noble County, Oklahoma